Emil Joseph Kapaun (April 20, 1916 – May 23, 1951) was a Roman Catholic priest and United States Army captain who served as a United States Army chaplain during World War II and the Korean War. Kapaun was a chaplain in the Burma Theater of World War II, then served again as a chaplain with the U.S. Army in Korea, where he was captured. He died in a prisoner of war camp.

In 1993, Pope John Paul II declared him a Servant of God, the first stage on the path to canonization.

In 2013, Kapaun posthumously received the Medal of Honor for his actions in Korea. He is the ninth American military chaplain Medal of Honor recipient.

The Defense POW/MIA Accounting Agency (DPAA) announced Kapaun's body was accounted for on March 2, 2021.

Early life
His parents, Enos and Elizabeth (Hajek) Kapaun, were Czech immigrants. He graduated from Pilsen High School in May 1930. Kapaun also graduated from Conception Abbey seminary college (College of New Engleberg; Conception Seminary College) in Conception, Missouri, in June 1936 and Kenrick Theological Seminary in St. Louis, Missouri, in 1940.

Priesthood
On June 9, 1940, Kapaun was ordained a Catholic priest of the Diocese of Wichita by Bishop Christian Herman Winkelmann at what is now Newman University in Wichita, Kansas. He celebrated his first Mass at St. John Nepomucene Catholic Church in Pilsen, Kansas. In January 1943, Kapaun was appointed auxiliary chaplain at the Herington Army Airfield near Herington, Kansas. In December 1943, Kapaun was appointed priest.

U.S. Army service

World War II

Kapaun entered the U.S. Army Chaplain School at Ft. Devens, Massachusetts in August 1944, and after graduating in October began his military chaplaincy at Camp Wheeler, Georgia. He and one other chaplain ministered to approximately 19,000 servicemen and women.
He was sent to India and served in the Burma Theater from April 1945 to May 1946. He ministered to U.S. soldiers and local missions, sometimes traversing nearly  a month by jeep or airplane. He was promoted to captain in January 1946. He was released from active duty in July 1946. Under the G.I. Bill, he earned a Master of Arts degree in Education at Catholic University of America in February 1948.
In September 1948, he returned to active duty in the U.S. Army and resumed his chaplaincy at Fort Bliss near El Paso, Texas. In December 1949, Kapaun left his parents and Pilsen for the last time, bound for Japan.

Occupation of Japan
In January 1950, Kapaun became a chaplain in the 8th Cavalry Regiment, 1st Cavalry Division, often performing battle drills near Mount Fuji, Japan. On July 15, 1950, the 1st Cavalry Division and Kapaun embarked and left Tokyo Bay sailing for Korea, less than a month after North Korea had invaded South Korea.

Korean War

1st Cavalry Division
The 1st Cavalry Division made the first amphibious landing in the Korean War on July 18, 1950. The Division was soon moved up to help slow the North Korean Korean People's Army (KPA)'s advance until more reinforcements could arrive. The Division engaged in several skirmishes with the KPA but had to retreat each time. Kapaun and his assistant learned of a wounded soldier stranded by enemy machine gun and small arms fire during one of these retreats. Knowing that no litter bearers were available, the two braved enemy fire and saved the man's life, for which Kapaun was awarded the Bronze Star Medal with a "V" device for valor.

The KPA continued to push the U.S. forces back into a perimeter around the port city of Pusan. Kapaun continued to make the rounds to encourage and pray with the troops of the 8th Regiment. His main complaint was lack of sleep for several weeks at a time. Finally, in mid-September and after the landing at Inchon, Kapaun and the rest of the United Nations Command forces broke out of the perimeter and pursued the KPA northward. On October 9, the division crossed the 38th parallel into North Korea, capturing the capital of Pyongyang and advancing to within  of the Chinese border.

Throughout the months of fighting, Kapaun gained a reputation for bravely serving the troops, rescuing the wounded and dead, and ministering to the living by performing baptisms, hearing confessions, offering Holy Communion and celebrating Mass on an improvised altar set up on the front end of a Jeep. Several times his Mass kit Jeep and trailer were destroyed by enemy fire. In letters home, he shared that he was thoroughly convinced that others' prayers helped him survive.

POW
The United Nations forces progressed northward but were met by a surprise intervention by the Chinese People's Volunteer Army (PVA). The first engagement with this new enemy took place at the Battle of Unsan near Unsan, North Korea, on November 1–2, 1950. Nearly 20,000 PVA soldiers attacked Kapaun's 8th Cavalry Regiment. Despite pleas for him to escape, he stayed behind with the 800 men of the 3rd Battalion as the rest of the regiment retreated. During the battle, he braved enemy fire and rescued nearly 40 men, for which he was later awarded the Medal of Honor. The Chinese continued to overwhelm the American troops. He and other members of the 3rd Battalion taken prisoner, was marched  to a temporary prison camp at Sombakol near the permanent camp (Prison Camp 5) at Pyoktong, North Korea, where they were later held. Kapaun was able to persuade some prisoners, who had ignored orders from officers, to carry the wounded.

Life in the prison camp was challenging, with sometimes up to 2 dozen men dying a day from malnutrition, disease, lice, and extreme cold. Kapaun refused to give in to despair and spent himself entirely for his men. He dug latrines, mediated disputes, gave away his food and raised morale among the prisoners. He was noted among his fellow POWs as one who would steal food for the men to eat. He also stood up to communist indoctrination, smuggled dysentery drugs to the doctor, Sidney Esensten, and led the men in prayer.

Death and burial
Kapaun developed a blood clot in one of his legs besides having dysentery and pneumonia. Weakened as the months passed, he managed to lead an Easter sunrise service on Sunday, March 25, 1951.

He was so weak the prison guards took him to a place in the Pyoktong camp they called the "hospital," where he died of malnutrition and pneumonia on May 23, 1951. It was originally reported Father Kapaun was buried in a mass grave near the Yalu River. However, in 2005 one of Kapaun's fellow POWs, William Hansen, said he and other prisoners had buried Kapaun separately in a single grave on higher ground, marking the gravesite with stones.

He was one of twelve chaplains to die in Korea. Four U.S. Army chaplains were taken prisoner in 1950, all of whom died while in captivity.

He was posthumously awarded the Legion of Merit by the U.S. Army for exceptionally meritorious conduct as a prisoner of war, as well as the Purple Heart.

As part of the 1953 Korean Armistice Agreement, Kapaun’s remains were among the 1,868 which were returned to U.S. custody in Operation Glory, although they were not able to be identified. His remains were buried at the National Memorial Cemetery of the Pacific (NMCP) in Honolulu, Hawaii, around 1956. His remains were disinterred and identified as part of Defense POW/MIA Accounting Agency’s Korean War Disinterment Project, a seven-phase plan begun in 2018, to disinter all remaining Korean War Unknowns from the NMCP.

On March 4, 2021, U.S. Senator Jerry Moran and the Catholic Diocese of Wichita confirmed the remains of Emil Kapaun had been identified.

On September 29, 2021, a Mass of Christian Burial was held in Kapaun's home state of Kansas at the Hartman Arena in Park City, near Wichita. Afterwards, a horse-drawn caisson carried his remains to the Cathedral of the Immaculate Conception in Wichita, where he was given military honors and interred inside the church.

Awards and decorations
Kapaun's Distinguished Service Cross was upgraded by the U.S. Army to the Medal of Honor on April 11, 2013. He was awarded the Legion of Merit for his actions as a POW. Kapaun was awarded the following U.S and foreign military awards:

Taegeuk Order of Military Merit (Republic of Korea) 
Kapaun was awarded the Taegeuk Order of Military Merit from President Moon Jae-in on behalf of the Republic of Korea on July 27, 2021.  This is the highest military recognition awarded by the Republic of Korea.

Bronze Star Medal
Kapaun was awarded the Bronze Star Medal with "V" Device on September 2, 1950, for his actions on August 2, 1950:

Medal of Honor

On August 18, 1951, he was posthumously awarded the Distinguished Service Cross for extraordinary action on November 1–2, 1950. However, his fellow soldiers and POWs felt that Kapaun deserved the Medal of Honor. In 2001, U.S. Representative Todd Tiahrt began a campaign to award the Medal of Honor to Kapaun. Before leaving office on September 16, 2009, Secretary of the Army Pete Geren sent Tiahrt a letter, agreeing that Kapaun was worthy of the honor. Admiral Michael Mullen, Chairman of the Joint Chiefs of Staff, also agreed.

The National Defense Authorization Act for Fiscal Year 2012 (Senate Bill 1867, Section 586) contained an authorization and a request to the President to upgrade Kapaun's Distinguished Service Cross to the Medal of Honor for acts of bravery during the Battle of Unsan on November 1–2, 1950, and while a prisoner of war until his death on May 23, 1951. President Obama presented the medal awarded on behalf of Kapaun to Kapaun's nephew at the White House on April 11, 2013.

His Medal of Honor citation reads:

Cause of beatification and canonization

The following is a general narrative from the many reports of Kapaun's ordeal as a prisoner of war given by many repatriated American soldiers after their release from prison camps. He was most remembered for his great humility, bravery, constancy, love, kindness, and solicitude for his fellow prisoners. "He was their hero... their admired and beloved "padre." He kept up the POWs' morale, and most of all, helped a lot of men to become good Catholics."

Reports received noted that Kapaun's feet had become badly frozen, but he continued to administer to the sick and wounded. He continuously went out under heavy mortar and shelling to rescue wounded and dying soldiers, risking capture or death.

Many accounts have been given of the many creature comforts he provided his comrades of the 8th Cavalry Regiment during imprisonment. They were both spiritual and physical. He provided endless hours of prayer and what nourishment he could find to all he could to keep them from starving to death.

A detailed account of Kapaun's life is recounted in Arthur Tonne's Chaplain Kapaun: Patriot Priest of the Korean Conflict:

In a very definite sense, we are all beneficiaries from the life of Fr. Kapaun. He has left us a stirring example of devotion to duty. He has passed on to us a spirit of tolerance and understanding. He has given us a share of dauntless bravery – of body and soul. He has transmitted to every one of us a new appreciation of America and a keener, more realistic understanding of our country's greatest enemy – godlessness, now stalking the world in the form of communism. He has bequeathed a picture of Christ-like life. What Fr. Kapaun willed to us cannot be contained in memorials, however costly or beautiful. It is a treasure for the human soul – the spirit of one who loved and served God and man – even unto death.

When Kapaun was assigned to the 8th Cavalry Regiment, which was surrounded and overrun by the Chinese army in North Korea in October and November 1950, he stayed behind with the wounded when the Army retreated. He allowed his capture, then risked death by preventing Chinese executions of wounded Americans too injured to walk. Following his death, as Kapaun's actions became known, Catholic faithful began to offer devotional prayers to him; these prayers came from U.S. service members, laymen and women across the United States, as well as those in East and Southeast Asia.

In 1993, Kapaun was named a Servant of God by Pope John Paul II, the Vatican's first step toward possible canonization.

On November 9, 2015, the Bishop of the Roman Catholic Diocese of Wichita in Wichita, Kansas, Carl A. Kemme, presented the positio, a 1,066-page-long report on his life, ministry, virtues, holiness, and other aspects, that must be compiled by the sponsoring diocese, approved by the bishop, and sent to the Cardinal Prefect of the Congregation for the Causes of Saints (CCS) in the Roman Curia at the Vatican, Cardinal Angelo Amato, for review. If the CCS and the pope approve this report, he will be given the title Servant of God. If they determine that he lived a life of virtue, he can also be called Venerable. If the pope then grants a declaration of martyrdom or approves a miracle posthumously attributed to Kapaun, he can be beatified.

A team of six historians gathered on June 21, 2016, and voiced their approval of the cause.

In January 2022, John Hotze, the chief investigator for Kapaun's cause for canonization, announced that the Vatican was considering whether to declare Kapaun a martyr for the Catholic faith, which if granted would hasten the process of canonization.

Possible 2006 miracle
In 2006, Avery Gerleman, who had an auto-immune disorder, entered into an 87-day coma after multiple organs were damaged. Her parents and others prayed for Kapaun's intercession, and she recovered. Later scans of her damaged lungs and kidneys showed no signs of scarring. Avery went on to become physically active, become a licensed practical nurse at Wichita Area Technical College, and plans on becoming a registered nurse.

Possible 2008 miracle
On June 29, 2008, the opening ceremony which officially opens the cause for sainthood for Kapaun was made on Father Kapaun Day, held at St. John Nepomucene Catholic Church in Pilsen, Kansas.

On June 26, 2009, Andrea Ambrosi, the Roman postulator for Kapaun's cause for canonization, arrived in Wichita to interview doctors about alleged miraculous events.

Among these is the claim of 20-year-old Chase Kear, who survived a severe head injury last year, in part, he and his family claim, because they petitioned Emil Kapaun to intercede for them. Kear, a member of the Hutchinson Community College track team, fell on his head during pole vaulting practice in October 2008, but, it is said, was miraculously healed despite being near death. The Rev. John Hotze, the judicial vicar for the Diocese of Wichita, and trained in canon law, will assist in investigating Kear's case.

Hotze has spent eight years investigating the proposed sainthood of Kapaun. The Catholic Church has considered canonizing Kapaun ever since soldiers were liberated from Korean prisoner-of-war camps in 1953 and told of Kapaun's heroism and faith. The Wichita Diocese has continued to receive reports of miracles involving Kapaun. He is being considered for possible designation as a martyr.

Possible 2011 miracle

On May 7, 2011, Nick Dellasega collapsed at a Get Busy Living 5K race in Pittsburg, Kansas (honoring the memory of Dylan Meier). Due to a series of coincidences, Dellasega survived, even though he had seemingly died on the scene. His childhood friend and EMT, Micah Ehling, is quoted by The Wichita Eagle as saying, "I know what a face looks like when the soul leaves the body. And that's what Nick looked like". Some bystanders attribute Dellasega's survival to the devotion of his cousin, Jonah Dellasega, who fell to his knees at the scene and prayed for Kapaun's intercession. In a strange coincidence not reported by The Eagle, Dylan Meier, in whose memory the 5K was being held, was slated to teach English in Korea at the time of his death.

Skeptics point out that Kapaun's spirit could not possibly have orchestrated the bizarre coincidences that saved Nick's life because some of them were set in motion long before Nick collapsed, including a visit by Nick's uncle, Mark, a medical doctor from Greenville, North Carolina. Divine providence, however, can be viewed as having set in motion all of the events. The Eagle reported, "The coincidences are strange enough and the prayer notable enough that a Catholic Church investigator has reported Nick's story to the Vatican, which happens to have a representative in Wichita again, sizing up Father Emil Kapaun for sainthood."

Memorials
 Kapaun Memorial Chapel; Seoul, South Korea; dedicated November 4, 1953.
 Kapaun Religious Retreat House; Ōiso, Japan; dedicated December 1954.
 Kapaun Air Station and Chapel, Germany; Kaiserslautern Military Community, Kaiserslautern, Germany; dedicated June 7, 1955.
 Father Kapaun Memorial Technical School; Kwanju, Korea; dedicated Summer 1955.
 Chaplain Kapaun Memorial High School; Wichita, Kansas; dedicated May 12, 1957. Later to become Kapaun Mt. Carmel Catholic High School, 1971.
 Honolulu Memorial at National Memorial Cemetery of the Pacific; Honolulu, Hawaii; dedicated 1964
 Bronze Door Panel at Cathedral of the Immaculate Conception; Wichita, Kansas; dedicated February 1997.
 Kapaun Chapel at Camp McGovern, Bosnia; dedicated 1998.
 Chaplain Kapaun Korean War Memorial Site; Pilsen, Kansas; dedicated June 3, 2001.
 Chaplain Kapaun Complex; Fort Riley, Kansas; dedicated 2001, 2002.
 Memorial Tablet added to the Kansas Korean War Memorial wall in Overland Park, Kansas; dedicated on November 11, 2014.
 Granite monument, U.S. Army Garrison Daegu; unveiled December 2014
 Chaplains Memorial; The Medal of Honor Grove; Freedoms Foundation; Valley Forge, PA; Induction, October 18, 2014.

Knights of Columbus
 Chaplain Emil J. Kapaun Knights of Columbus Council #3423 Pilsen, KS
 Knights of Columbus Council 3744
 Knights of Columbus Council 11987
 Father Emil Kapaun Knights of Columbus Council #12965 Oak Grove KY
 Chaplain Emil J. Kapaun Knights of Columbus Council #14218 Fort Riley, KS
 Emil Kapaun Knights of Columbus Fourth Degree Assembly #2721; Katy, Texas.
 FR. EMIL J. KAPAUN ASSEMBLY #3260 VAIL, ARIZONA [Knights of Columbus]
 Fr. Emil Kapaun Assembly #3274 Paoli, Pennsylvania, Knights of Columbus
 Fr. Emil Kapaun Assembly #3826 Pearl, Mississippi, Knights of Columbus

Kapaun's Men 
In 2015 several men came together to form Kapaun's Men, a movement that seeks to continue Father Kapaun's legacy of encouraging men to accompany one another in faith. The group has produced a documentary life of Father Kapaun, several video series, and hosts a weekly podcast called The Foxhole.

TV portrayal
He was played by James Whitmore in the Crossroads TV episode "The Good Thief", which aired on November 25, 1955.

See also

 Four Chaplains
 List of Korean War Medal of Honor recipients
 Roman Catholic Archdiocese for the Military Services
 American Catholic Servants of God, Venerables, Beatified, and Saints
 Charles J. Watters – Vietnam War chaplain Medal of Honor awardee

References

Further reading
 The Miracle of Father Kapaun: Priest, Soldier, and Korean War Hero; Wenzl and Heying; Ignatius Press; 200 pages; 2013; .
 A Saint Among Us: Remembering Father Emil J. Kapaun; Father Kapaun Guild; 168 pages; 2005; .
 A Shepherd in Combat Boots: Chaplain Emil Kapaun of the 1st Cavalry Division; William Maher; Burd Street Press; 199 pages; 1997; .
 The story of Chaplain Kapaun: Patriot Priest of the Korean conflict; Arthur Tonne; Didde Publishers; 255 pages; 1954; . Online transcription

External links

 Father Kapaun Guild, Catholic Diocese of Wichita
 Kapaun's Men
 The Story of Chaplain Kapaun, 1954 biography, a book by Arthur Tonne
 Father Emil Kapaun's life, deeds compiled; The Wichita Eagle.
 
 Crossroads episode "The Good Thief", viewable in its entirety at archive.org
 Sunflower Journeys: Father Kapaun, video

1916 births
1951 deaths
20th-century venerated Christians
20th-century Roman Catholic martyrs
20th-century American Roman Catholic priests
Catholic University of America alumni
Newman University, Wichita
American military personnel killed in the Korean War
People from Marion County, Kansas
American Servants of God
Korean War chaplains
United States Army chaplains
American prisoners of war in the Korean War
Recipients of the Distinguished Service Cross (United States)
Recipients of the Legion of Merit
American people of Czech descent
Korean War recipients of the Medal of Honor
United States Army Medal of Honor recipients
Roman Catholic Diocese of Wichita
Religious leaders from Kansas
Catholics from Kansas
Deaths from pneumonia in North Korea
United States Army personnel of World War II
United States Army personnel of the Korean War